A Time to Be Jolly is a long-playing vinyl album recorded by Bing Crosby for RCA imprint Daybreak Records (DR 2006) at Mercury Sound Studio West on Mission Street, San Francisco. Crosby was supported by Jack Halloran and the Voices of Christmas with the orchestra conducted by Les Brown.

Four tracks were originally recorded on November 16, 1970 and the remainder were overdubbed by Crosby on September 7/8, 1971 using orchestral tracks recorded on August 31, 1971.  Several tracks have the Voices of Christmas singing a few lines from the Alfred Burt carols as an introduction and these are shown in the listing. Another song, "An Old-Fashioned Christmas", is thought to have been overdubbed by Crosby but it has never been released.

The album was reissued on LP by 20th Century Fox Records (as A Holiday Toast) in 1977, and on CD by PolyGram Records (as Christmas Album) in 1994.

Reception
Billboard commented: "Crosby joins the new Daybreak label (handled by RCA), with his first Christmas package in many years! An exceptional one it is! With fresh material, Crosby is in top vocal form with the title tune as well as with “Christmas Toast” and “I Sing Noel.” Delightful package, it should prove a heavy seller for the season."

Track listing

References

External links
 BING magazine
 BingCrosby.com
 / A Bing Crosby Discography

Bing Crosby albums
1971 Christmas albums
Christmas albums by American artists
Pop Christmas albums